The British Rail Class 302 (pre-TOPS AM2) was a type of electric multiple unit (EMU) introduced between 1958 and 1960 for outer suburban passenger services on the London, Tilbury and Southend line. This class of multiple unit was constructed using the Mark 1 bodyshell and was slam-door.

Overview
Like all the Eastern Region AC EMUs of the period, they were equipped to operate on both 25 kV AC and the reduced 6.25 kV voltage in the inner London areas where headroom for the overhead wires was reduced. On the LT&S the changeover point was just east of Barking station on both Upminster and Tilbury routes with the link to Forest Gate being at 6.25kV ac.

Each unit was formed of four coaches, in the following formation: DTSOL (Driving Trailer Second Open with Lavatory) – MBS (Motor Brake Second) – TCsoL (Trailer Composite semi-open with Lavatory) – DTS (Driving Trailer Second). The initial set numbers were 201–312, later prefixed by the class number 302 with the introduction of TOPS.

The Battery Driving Trailer and Driving Trailer were fitted with drop head buckeye couplers with screw coupler in the Guards Van, retractable buffers are also fitted only on outer ends of the Battery Driving Trailer/Driving Trailer.

Service history
Public service started on 16 March 1959 with Class 302s working the first electric passenger trains between Colchester and Clacton at 25kV ac. A revised half hourly timetable started on April 13 from Colchester with a 8 car train splitting at Thorpe-le-Soken with half going to Walton-on-Naze

Some Class 302s were used for crew training in Manchester before the Class 304 units were introduced in April 1960.

They were among the first electric units delivered to the Eastern Region and, although ordered for the LT&S electrification, a route they were long associated with, they were used initially on the Liverpool Street to Hertford East, Bishop's Stortford and Enfield Town lines when they were electrified in November 1960. The 302s also stepped in when electrification was extended from Chelmsford to Colchester in 1961 and when the Class 305 units were having problems on the then new north-east London electric services. Some formations were temporarily reduced to three cars for the Enfield Town services.

The first 25 units remained on the GE main line for the bulk of their lives, with the remainder operating on the LT&S from Fenchurch Street from 1962.

Between November 1961 and June 1962, the class suffered traction motor insulation trouble which meant the motors had to be re-wound.

302312 was used as a test bed for silicon rectifier technology and a Brentford transformer from 1962 to 1964, then used to test thyristor control equipment until 1972, becoming the first electric train so fitted in the UK.

Unit 302 244 was involved in an accident in 1972 with a lorry at a level crossing at Low Street railway station in Tilbury, after which it was decided to scrap the leading carriage, BDTC 75292. This was replaced with DTSO 77164, originally belonging to a Manchester-Bury Line Class 504. It remained like this until May 1983 when it acquired a spare BDTC, 75298, from withdrawn unit 302250.

In 1987-88, 6 units were short formed with the removal of the trailer composite (TCsoL) and based at Ilford EMD for work on the GE lines.

 

Following the privatisation of British Rail, ownership of the last 30 units passed to Eversholt Rail Group with all units being leased by LTS Rail.

The run-down of class 302s started in 1984 with the majority being phased out when Class 310 where introduced on to the LT&S in 1988 with last 30 units being withdrawn by 1998 with the introduction of Class 317 in 1997 and with extra Class 312 in 1998.

Electrical equipment

Electrical equipment was supplied by English Electric with the majority of equipment being interchangeable with Class 308 units.

Electrically there were three main systems, Control which operated at 110 volts DC, provided by nickel iron alkaline secondary cells, auxiliary 250 volts AC from the tertiary winding of the main transformer which provided power to the battery charger which was also rectified to power the main compressor, and finally power circuits derived from secondary winding of the main transformer at 1,500 volts AC.

The primary winding of the transformer was designed to operate on either 6.25 kV or 25 kV with voltage sensing equipment fitted to ensure the correct arrangement of primary windings for a given voltage. An incorrect voltage selection device was fitted to both the Class 302 and Class 308 stock so that if the primary winding was connected for 6.25 kV when supplied with 25 kV the air blast circuit breaker manufactured by Brown Boveri would remain closed but the pantograph would be lowered. Should this happen the transformer would require changing and overhaul as well as possibly other equipment due to flashover damage.

The transformer was also protected by a Buchholz relay which monitored any gas build-up within the cooling/insulating oil, as the acetylene (ethyne) gas generated is highly explosive. All Class 302 and 308 stock were fitted with Stone Faiveley pantographs for current collection from the overhead line. A particular oddity of Eastern/Anglian region EMU stock was the fitting of fibre glass snow shields between the pantograph and the supporting insulators.

One member of the class, 302 302, was experimentally fitted with thyristor control in the early 1970s. After the experiment it was converted back to the original tap changer control, although the guard's van remained slightly different internally.

Refurbished Units

On refurbishment the trailer coaches were fitted with B5 bogies for both driving ends, along with conversions of the Battery Driving Second Open (BDTSOL) to a Battery Driving Trailer Composite Open (BDTCOL) having moved the first class accommodation to a position over the Westinghouse CM38 main compressor which was noisy and caused vibration, Driving Standard Compartment to a Driving Standard Open DTSO having removed the compartments for an open layout. The centre trailer had B4 bogies fitted with the Trailer Composite Semi Open (TCSOL) design converted to Trailer Standard Open (TSOL). The motor coach retained its Gresley derived bogies after refurbishment with compartments removed for an open layout with guards van. All 30 units would also receive gangway connections between cars within the unit.

Originally the vehicles were insulated with blue asbestos which was removed and sealed during refurbishment between 1982 - 84 with some of the compartments being removed and reconfigured to open saloons.

Units that received the original facelift with just Motor Brake Second (MBS) and the Driving Trailer Second (DTS) having their compartments removed for an open layout with the (TCSOL) not receiving any layout changes and keeping the Gresley bogies were:

202, 204, 205, 213, 215, 216, 217, 218, 220, 225, 226, 227, 228, 231, 232, 234, 236, 239, 245, 251, 252, 254, 259, 261, 262, 263, 274, 277, 279, 280, 283, 284, 285, 292, 293, 297, 298, 299, 300, 301, 303, 304, 307, 308, 311

The 30 units that received the full refurbishment and would last until withdrawal of 302s from service on LT&S were:

Class 302/9 - non-passenger conversions

The sub-classification 302/9 was used for seven non-passenger carrying conversions. Units 302990-993 were reduced to three-car length and converted for use as Royal Mail parcels units, with the addition of bodyside roller shutter doors, and repainted in Royal Mail red livery. Units 302996-998 were also reduced to three-car length and used as departmental sandite rail treatment units, later being reclassified as Class 937.

Parcels Units

Departmental Sandite Units

Liveries
When introduced, the units were outshopped in plain BR EMU suburban green livery with the early lion and wheel crest on the MBS. In 1962 a small yellow end became mandatory for all units. In the mid 1960's BR Rail Blue, also known as Monastral blue, was applied to 112 members of the fleet and from 1968 a full yellow end now became mandatory to increase visibility for permanent way staff on the track. From 1982, when refreshed units were released from the works, they were painted in the then standard BR blue and grey livery. 302217 was the first member of the class to receive Network SouthEast Livery by 1987, being the sole example until 1990–1993 when NSE livery was applied to the 30 remaining class members. Un-refurbished unit 302207, later renumbered to 302200, received the original green livery with a small yellow panel in 1987.

Preservation

Two driving trailers, 75033 and 75250, which belonged to units 302 201 and 302 227, are preserved at Mangapps Railway Museum near Burnham-on-Crouch, Essex. These units have been repainted into BR overall blue with yellow ends and are still in very good condition, with the destination scrolls still in working order, the seats still in British Rail colours and the Network South East maps still in very good condition. The rest of the fleet has been scrapped since withdrawal in late 1999.

References

Further reading

External links 

 Class 302 general overview on Class 310 site
 BW Photo of unit no. 298 at Barking c. 1964
 

302
Train-related introductions in 1958
25 kV AC multiple units